John McCandless (29 February 1892–1940) was an Irish footballer who played in the Football League for Accrington Stanley and Bradford (Park Avenue). John would later go on to be one of the founders of and the first player manager for Coleraine F.C.

References

1892 births
1940 deaths
Irish association footballers (before 1923)
Pre-1950 IFA international footballers
Association football forwards
English Football League players
Belfast Celtic F.C. players
Linfield F.C. players
Bradford (Park Avenue) A.F.C. players
Hibernian F.C. players
Accrington Stanley F.C. (1891) players
Mid Rhondda F.C. players
Lovell's Athletic F.C. players
Coleraine F.C. players